Zahořany is a municipality and village in the Domažlice District in the Plzeň Region of the Czech Republic. It has about 1,000 inhabitants.

Administrative parts
Villages of Bořice, Hříchovice, Oprechtice, Sedlice and Stanětice are administrative parts of Zahořany.

References

Villages in Domažlice District